Philip Anthony "Scooby" Wright III (born August 28, 1994) is an American football linebacker for the Birmingham Stallions of the United States Football League (USFL). He played college football at Arizona.

Early years
Wright attended Cardinal Newman High School in Santa Rosa, California, where he was a two-sport star in football and track. He was regarded as a two-star recruit by Rivals.com. Wright was a four-year varsity player at linebacker and running back for the Cardinals. Wright was an all-state selection his junior and senior years. Also a standout shot putter on the track & field team, Wright had a top-throw of 15.67 meters (51–3).

College career
Despite being lightly recruited, Wright earned immediate playing time as a true freshman at the University of Arizona in 2013. He started 12 of 13 games, recording 83 tackles and an interception and garnering Honorable Mention All-Pac-12 honors. Wright remained a starter as a sophomore in 2014. He was a finalist for numerous awards, including the Walter Camp Award. He claimed the Bronko Nagurski Trophy, Lombardi Award, Jack Lambert Award, Chuck Bednarik Award and also was named the Pac-12 Defensive Player of the Year, becoming the first sophomore to ever win the conference award. Wright also earned first-team All-Pac-12 honors. He had the highest finish of any defensive player in the 2014 Heisman Trophy voting, finishing ninth on the ballot. As a junior in 2015, Wright played only 3 games due to injury, recording 2 sacks and 23 tackles. After his junior year, he announced his intentions to enter the 2016 NFL Draft.

College statistics

Professional career

Cleveland Browns
Wright was drafted by the Cleveland Browns in the 7th round (250th overall) of the 2016 NFL Draft. On May 14, 2016, Wright signed a four-year deal worth $2.401 million featuring a $60,700 signing bonus. He was waived by the Browns on September 20, 2016. The next day, he was signed to the practice squad.

Arizona Cardinals
On December 13, 2016, Wright was signed by the Arizona Cardinals off the Browns' practice squad.

On September 2, 2017, Wright was waived by the Cardinals and was signed to the practice squad the next day. He was promoted to the active roster on September 8, 2017. He was waived on September 11, 2017, and was re-signed to the practice squad. He was promoted back to the active roster on October 3, 2017.

On September 1, 2018, Wright was waived by the Cardinals.

Arizona Hotshots
On December 11, 2018, Wright signed with the Arizona Hotshots of the AAF. Wright was credited with 9 tackles in the 8 games played prior to the league shutting down.

New England Patriots
After the AAF ceased operations in April 2019, Wright signed with the New England Patriots on August 25, 2019. He was released during final roster cuts on August 31, 2019. He was re-signed to the practice squad on September 20, 2019. On October 1, 2019, Wright was released from the practice squad.

DC Defenders

In October 2019, Wright was selected by the DC Defenders in the 2020 XFL Draft. In 4 games played, Wright put up 17 tackles. He had his contract terminated when the league suspended operations on April 10, 2020.

Wright signed with the Alphas of The Spring League on October 17, 2020.

Birmingham Stallions
On February 23, 2022, Wright was drafted by the Birmingham Stallions of the United States Football League. Wright won Defensive Player of the Week in week 4 with six tackles, one sack, and two tackles for loss. He was ruled inactive for the game against the Philadelphia Stars on May 15, 2022, with a calf injury and an illness. He was transferred back to the active roster on May 20, but moved back to the inactive roster later that day. He scored a pick six in the fourth quarter of the 2022 USFL Championship game for the go ahead score.

Statistics

Post Season

Personal life
Wright is the son of Philip Jr. and Annette Wright. His father is head softball coach at Santa Rosa Junior College and played football at Long Beach State. His sister, Ashley, played softball at Illinois. Wright has been called "Scooby" since he was a baby when his father nicknamed him.

References

External links

 Arizona Wildcats bio
 Cleveland Browns bio

1994 births
Living people
All-American college football players
American football linebackers
Arizona Cardinals players
Arizona Hotshots players
Arizona Wildcats football players
Birmingham Stallions (2022) players
Cleveland Browns players
DC Defenders players
New England Patriots players
People from Windsor, California
Players of American football from California
Sportspeople from Santa Rosa, California
The Spring League players